The Dm6 and Dm7 were diesel multiple units built by Valmet in the 1950s and 1960s for Valtionrautatiet. They are known by their nickname lättähattu (Finnish for "flat cap", the first widespread youth culture movement in Finland).

History 

At the beginning of the 1950s it became clear that VR needed multiple units to compete with buses in short-distance traffic. In 1952, seven Dm6s were ordered from Valmet, and eight more the next year.

After testing the Dm6:s and having noted that the new DMU:s worked well in Finnish conditions, VR ordered more units. In total, 197 Dm7 class multiple units were built with some modifications (a larger wheel size, for instance).

Variants

DmG7 
Three Dm7:s (numbers 4145–4147) were transformed into goods transport vehicles. They were withdrawn in 1981.

Ttv 
16 Dm7:s were transformed into electric maintenance vehicles.

Preservation 
All Dm6:s have been withdrawn from service. 20 Dm7:s are preserved by Finnish museum railway associations.

No:4020 is at the Finnish Railway Museum.

See also 
 Finnish Railway Museum
 VR Group
 List of Finnish locomotives
 List of railway museums Worldwide
 Heritage railways
 List of heritage railways
 Restored trains
 Jokioinen Museum Railway
 History of rail transport in Finland

References 

Literature

External links 
 
Finnish Railway Museum
Steam Locomotives in Finland Including the Finnish Railway Museum

Valmet
Multiple units of Finland